Florian Toplitsch (born 7 September 1991) is an Austrian football player. He plays for Völser SV.

Club career
He made his Austrian Football First League debut for WSG Wattens on 12 August 2016 in a game against SC Wiener Neustadt.

In the summer of 2021, he joined Völser SV in the fourth-tier Tiroler Liga.

References

External links
 

1991 births
Living people
Austrian footballers
Association football midfielders
WSG Tirol players
2. Liga (Austria) players
Austrian Football Bundesliga players
Austrian Regionalliga players